Edward Charles Harmon (born December 16, 1946 in North Tonawanda, New York) is a former American football linebacker for the American Football League's Cincinnati Bengals. He played college football at the University of Louisville.

Early years
Harmon was born in North Tonawanda, a suburb of Buffalo, in Western New York. There he attended Bishop Gibbons High School. He moved on to play for the University of Louisville, where he was a backup fullback behind Wayne Patrick. 

After being deemed "too valuable" to be a second stringer, he was moved to linebacker as a junior, making a name for himself as a hard hitter with great intensity. In 1966, he set a single-game school record with 16 tackles while playing against the University of Tulsa.

He was inducted into the University of Louisville Athletics Hall of Fame.

Professional career

Dallas Cowboys
Harmon was selected by the Dallas Cowboys in the third round (71st overall) of the 1968 NFL Draft, because they were impressed that his athleticism allowed him to play linebacker at a bigger size than most players could in that era. 

The Cowboys were deep at linebacker and he couldn't make the team, so he spent his rookie season on the taxi squad. In 1969, he was tried at defensive end and offensive tackle, before being released on September 9. Instead of joining the taxi squad again, he decided to sign with a different team.

Cincinnati Bengals
In 1969, he signed as a free agent with the Cincinnati Bengals. He played in 11 contests and was voted the player of the game against the New York Jets. He was waived injured on August 25, 1970.

Personal life
Harmon played rugby in Chicago and Louisville.

References

External links
Gibbons' Harmon almost a Bill now a Bengal

1946 births
Living people
Players of American football from Buffalo, New York
American football linebackers
Louisville Cardinals football players
Dallas Cowboys players
Cincinnati Bengals players
American Football League players